Daniel Robert Ficca (born February 7, 1939) is a former professional American football player who played guard for five seasons for the Oakland Raiders and the New York Jets in the American Football League.

1939 births
Living people
People from Northumberland County, Pennsylvania
Players of American football from Pennsylvania
American football offensive guards
USC Trojans football players
Oakland Raiders players
New York Jets players
American Football League players